Heritage trees in Singapore are individual mature trees specially selected for protection by law under the Heritage Trees Scheme adopted on 17 August 2001. Implemented at the same time as the Heritage Roads scheme, it is part of a nationwide drive in tree conservation efforts not just within nature reserves, parks, and newly established tree conservation areas, but also anywhere else in the urban and rural environment of Singapore.

In support of the Scheme, a Heritage Trees Fund was established by the Hongkong and Shanghai Banking Corporation Limited (HSBC) to launch a conservation program that promotes protection and appreciation of Singapore's natural heritage. The program includes initiatives such as the installation of interpretive signage and a nomination scheme for the community. There are 259 Heritage Trees in the Heritage Tree Register.

Selection
Trees are added to the scheme through endorsement by a nine-member panel of experts, currently headed by Dr Leong Chee Chiew, Deputy Chief Operating Officer of the National Parks Board.

List of heritage trees
The list of heritage trees are available on an online register.

References

External links
Heritage Trees Scheme
National Parks Board

Nature conservation in Singapore
Flora of Singapore
Individual trees in Singapore
Lists of biota of Singapore
Natural history of Singapore
Trees
S
T